Oscar Henry Dodson (January 3, 1905–January 22, 1996) was a rear admiral in the United States Navy, who served during World War II. After retiring from the Navy, Dodson was appointed Assistant Professor of History at the University of Illinois. He was also a noted numismatist and served as president of the American Numismatic Association (ANA) from 1957 to 1961.

Academics

Oscar Henry Dodson received a Bachelor of Science from the United States Naval Academy in 1927. He is also a graduate from the United States Naval Postgraduate School which lists him among its distinguished alumni.

In 1953, he graduated from the University of Illinois at Urbana–Champaign with a M.A. in Russian History. From 1957 to 1959 he served as Assistant Professor of History and in 1966 he was appointed Director of the Classical and European Culture Museum at the university.

Military service

Oscar joined the Navy as an ensign in 1927 after he graduated from the Naval Academy. A brief history of his service is as follows:

 Commissioned ensign, United States Navy, 1927
 advanced through grades to rear admiral, United States Navy, 1957
 mobilization planning officer, Bureau Naval Personnel, 1945-1948
 commanding officer, United States Ship Thomas Jefferson, 1949-1950
 professor naval science, commander Naval Reserve Officers Training Corps unit, University of Illinois, 1950-1953
 commander, Landing Ship Flotilla, Atlantic Fleet, 1954-1955
 chief staff, United States Naval mission to Greece, 1955-1956
 chief staff, 1st Naval District, Boston, 1956-1957
 retired, 1957

Doolittle Raid

In 1942, he was on the  when the Doolittle Raid was launched. He wrote an eyewitness account which was published in “The Hornets and Their Heroic Men”, a book by Hornet veterans Kenneth M. Glass and Harold L. Buell. His account was published on USSHornetMuseum.org with permission of the authors. His account includes quotes from the ship's Commanding Officer, Captain Marc Mitscher, and Jimmy Doolittle:

Battle of the Santa Cruz Islands

Dodson's Silver Star award states the following:

USS Thomas Jefferson

He was commanding officer of the  1949 to 1950 when it was assigned to the Military Sea Transportation Service.

Numismatics
A numismatist most of his life, Dodson served as president of the American Numismatic Association from 1957 to 1961 and was responsible for bridging the transition between "traditional numismatics" and the then-new investment market. In the Centennial History of the American Numismatic Association, author Q. David Bowers wrote, "More than any other ANA president since August G. Heaton . . . Oscar Dodson was a philosopher."

He joined the ANA in 1933, and became life member number 78 in 1950 - the same year he received the ANA Medal of Merit. He served on the United States Assay Commission in 1948 and the Hobbies Committee of the U.S. State Department's "People-to-People" program.

In 1962 he authored the book Money Tells the Story published by Whitman Publishing. He also served as a contributing editor to COINage magazine from 1973 to 1987.

Two years after retiring from the Navy, he established The Money Museum at the National Bank of Detroit, serving as its director for six years. He also was honorary assistant curator of the ANA Money Museum. Through his generosity, many important ancient Greek coins and other items were donated to the Association. Oscar Dodson received the Association's highest honor, the Farran Zerbe Memorial Award, in 1968, and the ANA's Lifetime Achievement Award in 1995.

Personal life

He married Pauline “Polly” Wellbrock Dodson (Sept 19, 1912-Aug 18, 2013) on December 17, 1932. During World War II, she volunteered for the American Red Cross Gray Ladies. She was appointed to the United States Assay Commission to the Mint by President John F. Kennedy.

References

1905 births
1996 deaths
American information and reference writers
American numismatists
United States Naval Academy alumni
United States Navy rear admirals
Recipients of the Silver Star
20th-century American historians
20th-century American non-fiction writers
United States Navy personnel of World War II